Heo Young-ho (born 2 July 1986) is a Korean professional Go player.

Biography 
Heo became a 5 dan in 2006. Also in 2006, he won his first title, the BC Card Cup. His record for 2006 was 58 wins and 25 losses (75%).

Promotion record

Career record
2006: 58 wins, 25 losses
2007: 64 wins, 24 losses
2008: 33 wins, 18 losses
2009: 35 wins, 18 losses
2010: 66 wins, 20 losses

Titles and runners-up

Korean Baduk League

References

External links
GoBase Profile
Sensei's Library Profile

1986 births
Living people
South Korean Go players